The Sheikh Mohammed bin Rashid Al Maktoum Centre for Cultural Understanding (SMCCU) is a non-profit organisation which promotes awareness of Emirati culture, customs, traditions and religion among expatriates and foreign visitors in the United Arab Emirates, as well as aiming to remove cultural barriers.

SMCCU was founded in 1998 by Sheikh Mohammed IV and is based in a traditional Emirati wind tower house, located in Bur Dubai's historic Al Fahidi neighbourhood. It operates under the banner of "Open Doors. Open Minds." The centre arranges numerous activities, including tours of heritage sites and landmarks in Dubai, educational programs for students, cultural awareness events, lectures, Arabic classes (in local Gulf dialect), iftars during Ramadan, as well as providing the experience of traditional Emirati food.

See also

 Culture of Dubai
 Dubai Culture and Arts Authority
 List of Emirati artists
 Tourism in Dubai
Jumeirah Mosque Dubai

References

External links
 
 Jumeirah Mosque Official Website
 Desert Friends Dubai

1998 establishments in the United Arab Emirates
Arts centres in the United Arab Emirates
Buildings and structures in Dubai
Culture in Dubai
Cultural centers
Cultural organisations based in the United Arab Emirates
Cultural promotion organizations
Organisations based in Dubai
Organizations established in 1998
Arab art scene
Non-profit organisations based in the United Arab Emirates